Yaryshevo is a rural locality (a village) in Nikolskoye Rural Settlement, Kaduysky District, Vologda Oblast, Russia. The population was 10 as of 2002.

Geography 
Yaryshevo is located 21 km northeast of Kaduy (the district's administrative centre) by road. Zykovo is the nearest rural locality.

References 

Rural localities in Kaduysky District